“Ventilator Blues” is a song by the English rock band the Rolling Stones that is included on their 1972 album Exile on Main St.

Background
“Ventilator Blues” marks one of only two times guitarist Mick Taylor was given credit alongside regular Stones scribes Mick Jagger and Keith Richards, the second time being the song "Criss Cross" which was not officially released until the 2020 Deluxe Edition of the album Goats Head Soup. In a 1973 interview with Nick Kent, Taylor stated that he wrote the song's riff. The song features Richards playing slide guitar and acoustic guitar, Taylor on lead guitar and a resonator guitar, Jagger on vocals, Bill Wyman on bass, Charlie Watts on drums, Nicky Hopkins on piano, and Bobby Keys and Jim Price on saxophone and trumpet respectively.

The song itself is a low and lumbering blues number, with Bill Janovitz saying in his review, “the instrumental arrangement clearly aims for the Chess Studios approach.” Jagger double tracks the lead vocal, a studio technique rarely used in Rolling Stones recordings. Janovitz concludes, “Jagger takes the Muddy Waters and Howlin' Wolf inspiration of the song's origins and does his best to betray the fact that he is a skinny middle-class English kid, convincingly delivering the time-bomb lyric with appropriate swagger.”

On pianist Nicky Hopkins notable contribution, Janovitz says, “[Hopkins plays] a rhythmically complex piano part on the verses, weaving in and out of the swooping guitar lick on the first verse and then building as the arrangement continues, playing nervous, jittery right-handed upper-register trills.  The pianist creates scary tension on an already claustrophobic and malevolent-sounding song.” The song is noted for its rising and falling chord progression, punctuated by the saxophone of Bobby Keys and the trumpet and trombone of Jim Price. Keeping beat is Charlie Watts on drums and Bill Wyman on bass who, although frequently absent during the recording sessions for Exile, made it on this occasion.

Recording and aftermath
Recording on “Ventilator Blues” began in late 1971. Richards said, “On ‘Ventilator Blues’ we got some weird sound of something that had gone wrong - some valve or tube that had gone. If something was wrong you just forgot about it. You'd leave it alone and come back tomorrow and hope it had fixed itself. Or give it a good kick.” Recording concluded in the early months of 1972 at Los Angeles' Sunset Sound Studios.

In 2003, Watts commented:

Live
The Rolling Stones have performed “Ventilator Blues” live only once, at Pacific Coliseum in Vancouver, British Columbia, on opening night of the 1972 North American Tour in support of Exile on Main Street.

Notes 

The Rolling Stones songs
1972 songs
Song recordings produced by Jimmy Miller
Songs written by Jagger–Richards